Kusapín (Saborikäte ) is a district of the county Panamanian indigenous Ngabe Bugle. Its capital is the town of Kusapín. The district's population is predominantly ethnic Ngobe Bugle.

Political division 
The district includes the communities of Kusapín, Blue Bay, Santa Catalina, Yucca Loma, Rio Chiriquí, Tobabe and Llano Bonito.

History 
The district is created Kusapín from Law 10 of March 1997. Next to the district Kankintú, is part of the region in Ñokribu Ngobe Bugle.

Getting there? 
Being located in the coastal regions of the province of Bocas del Toro, is necessary to travel by boat. These depart daily at 6:00 am and arrive at the port of Chiriqui Grande from 8 to 9 am, depending on weather conditions. Leaving the port to Kusapín at 11:00 am, drivers reliable as Rutilio Mr. Trotman, Roger Hooker, Chalito, Yimmi.

References

Sources 
World Gazeteer: Panama – World-Gazetteer.com

Populated places in Ngöbe-Buglé Comarca